Women in Parliament may refer to:

Politics
 Women in the Sri Lankan Parliament
 Women in the 39th Canadian Parliament

Other
 Assemblywomen (play) aka Aristophanes' Ecclesiazusae (Greek: Ἐκκλησιάζουσαι Ekklesiazousai) -- a 4th-century BCE Greek play

See also
 Women in Congress (disambiguation)
 Women in the Senate (disambiguation)
 Women in the House (disambiguation)
 Women in House of Representatives (disambiguation)
 Women in government